This is a list of Canadian children's books.

Canadian children's books

A

  Adeline's Dream (2005), a novel by Linda Aksomitis
  Adventures of Cow (2005–06), a picture book series by Lori Korchek
  The Adventures of Sajo and her Beaver People (1935), a novel by Grey Owl
  After the War (1996), a novel by Carol Matas
  African Adventure (1963), a novel by Canadian-born American author Willard Price
  Airborn (2004), a novel by Kenneth Oppel
  Alligator Pie (1974), poetry book by Dennis Lee
  Alphabeasts (2002), a picture book by Wallace Edwards
  Amazon Adventure (1949), a novel by Willard Price
  Amelia and Me (2013), a novel by Heather Stem
  Amos Daragon (2009), a series of fantasy fiction books by Bryan Perro
  Ancient Thunder (2006), a fantasy picture book by artist and writer Leo Yerxa
  And Then It Happened (2003), a series by Michael Wade and Laura Wade
  Anne of Avonlea (1909), a novel by Lucy Maud Montgomery
  Anne of Green Gables (1908), a novel by Lucy Maud Montgomery
  Anne of Ingleside (1939), a novel by Lucy Maud Montgomery
  Anne of the Island (1915), a novel by Lucy Maud Montgomery
  Anne of Windy Poplars (1936), a novel by Lucy Maud Montgomery
  Anne's House of Dreams (1917), a novel by Lucy Maud Montgomery
  Arctic Adventure (1980), a book by Willard Price
  Awake and Dreaming (1996), a novel by author Kit Pearson and illustrator Margot Zemach

B

  Before Green Gables (2008), a prequel to the Anne Shirley series by Budge Wilson
  Bella's Tree (2009), a book written by Janet Russell, with illustrations by Jirina Marton
  The Blythes Are Quoted (2009), a book completed by L.M. Montgomery (1874–1942) near the end of her life but not published in its entirety until 2009
  The Boy & the Bindi (2016), a picture book by Vivek Shraya and illustrated by Rajni Perera
  The Boy from the Sun (2006), a book by author Duncan Weller
  The Boy Sherlock Holmes (2007–12), a series of novels by Shane Peacock
  Bradley McGogg, the Very Fine Frog (2009), a book by Tim Beiser, illustrated by Rachel Berman
  Brains Benton (1959–61), a series written by Charles Spain Verral. However, after book #1, all the rest were written under the pen name George Wyatt.
  The Brownies (1887–1918), a series by illustrator and author Palmer Cox
  Buzz about Bees (2013), a non-fiction book for ages 7+ by Kari-Lynn Winters

C

  Caillou (1989), a series of books by Christine L'Heureux
  Camp X (2002), a spy novel by Eric Walters
  Cannibal Adventure (1972), a novel by Willard Price
  Chronicles of Avonlea (1912), a collection of short stories by Lucy Maud Montgomery
  Chronicles of Faerie (1993), a young adult fantasy series by O.R. Melling
  Cinderella Penguin (1992), a book by Janet Perlman

D
  Darkwing (2007), a young adult fantasy novel by Kenneth Oppel
  Diving Adventure (1970), a book by Willard Price

E

  Elephant Adventure
  Elixir
  Elliot Moose
  Emily Climbs
  Emily of New Moon
  Emily's Quest

F
  Firewing
  Franklin the Turtle
  Further Chronicles of Avonlea

G

  Ghost Train 
  Giant; or Waiting for the Thursday Boat 
  Gift Days
  Gorilla Adventure
  A Growling Place

H
  Hana's Suitcase
  Hiding Edith
  The Hunter's Moon
  The Hydrofoil Mystery

I
  Imagine A Day
  An Island in the Soup

J
  Jacob Two-Two
  Jane of Lantern Hill
  Jeffrey and Sloth
  Jewels from the Moon

K
  The Kids Book of Aboriginal Peoples in Canada
  Kilmeny of the Orchard

L
  The Light-Bearer's Daughter
  Lion Adventure
  Love You Forever

M

  Magic for Marigold
  Meet Me at the Monkey Trees
  Miss Mousie's Blind Date
  Mistress Pat
  Mr. Bass's Planetoid
  Mr. Mugs
  A Mystery for Mr. Bass

N
  Northwest Passage

O
 On My Walk
 On the Trapline

P

  Paddle-to-the-Sea
  The Paper Bag Princess
  Pat of Silver Bush
  Penelope and the Humongous Burp
  The Princess and the Pony
  Project Superhero
  Punkinhead

R
  The Railroad Adventures of Chen Sing
  Rainbow Valley
  Rilla of Ingleside

S

  Safari Adventure
  Scaredy Squirrel
  Silverwing (novel)
  Silverwing (series)
  Skybreaker
  The Song Within My Heart
  South Sea Adventure
  The Stamp Collector
  Starclimber
  The Story Girl
  Stowaway to the Mushroom Planet
  The Summer King
  Sunwing

T

  Ten Birds
  Three Little Dreams
  Tiger Adventure
  Time and Mr. Bass
  The Tiny Kite of Eddie Wing

U
  The Ultimate Book of Hockey Trivia for Kids
  Underwater Adventure
  United We Stand

V
  Volcano Adventure

W

  The Waiting Dog
  We All Fall Down
  We Found a Hat
  Weird Rules to Follow
  Whale Adventure  Willard Price's Adventure series  The Wonderful Flight to the Mushroom PlanetY
  Yuck, A Love StoryZ
  ZorgamazooSee also

 List of American children's books
 Lists of books

Further readingBasic Book List for Canadian Schools (3 vols.) (1968–69)Canadian Books for Children (1988)Kanata: An Anthology of Canadian Children's Literature''

References

 
 
Lists of children's books